Danilo Aguiar Rocha (born February 13, 1981, in Alegre) is a Brazilian central defender. Former clubs are C.D. Santa Clara, Esporte Clube Vitória, AC Bellinzona and Vitória S.C.

Danilo left for Portugal in August 2005.

External links
https://web.archive.org/web/20081121102828/http://www.sambafoot.com.br/jogadores/2984_Danilo.html
http://www.zerozero.pt/jogador.php?id=20382
2005-06 Liga Profile 
2006-07 Liga Profile 
2007-08 Liga Profile 
2008-09 Liga Profile 
CBF 

Brazilian footballers
Brazilian expatriate footballers
Esporte Clube Vitória players
Clube Atlético Sorocaba players
Esporte Clube São Bento players
Vitória S.C. players
C.D. Santa Clara players
Primeira Liga players
People from Alegre, Espírito Santo
1981 births
Living people
Association football defenders
Sportspeople from Espírito Santo